Aksu is a city in and the seat of Aksu Prefecture, Xinjiang, lying at the northern edge of the Tarim Basin. The name Aksu literally means "white water" (in Turkic) and is used for both the oasis town and the Aksu River.

The economy of Aksu is mostly agricultural, with cotton, in particular long-staple cotton (Gossypium hirsutum), as the main product. Also produced are grain, fruits, oils and beets. The industry mostly consists of weaving, cement and chemical industries.

The land currently under the administration of the Aksu City is divided in two parts, separated by the Aral City. The northern part hosts the city center, while the southern part is occupied by the Taklamakan Desert.

Aksu airport is considered a military airport in China (although also available for civil usage). Only aircraft registered in China can land in Aksu. This means if you are flying to Aksu from international origins you have to land in a major airport in China like Beijing, Shanghai, Guangzhou and change to China registered aircraft which tail number starts with B.

Etymology
The name Aksu comes from the name of the Aksu River which is the Uyghur word for "white water". It is transliterated as Akesu in Chinese Pinyin.

History

Gumo 
From the Former Han dynasty (125 BCE to 23 CE) at least until the early Tang dynasty (618–907 CE), Aksu was known as Gumo  [Ku-mo].  The ancient capital town of Nan ("Southern Town") was likely well south of the present town.

During the Han dynasty, Gumo is described as a "kingdom" (guo) containing 3,500 households and 24,500 individuals, including 4,500 people able to bear arms. It is said to have produced copper, iron and orpiment. The territory of Gumo was roughly situated in the counties of Baicheng and Wensu and the city of Aksu of nowadays.

Baluka 
During the Buddhist era, it was known as Bharuka, Bohuan and Baluka, Bolujia (in pinyin), Po-lu-chia (in Wade–Giles).

The Chinese pilgrim Xuanzang visited this "kingdom" in 629 CE and referred to it as Baluka. He recorded that there were tens of Sarvastivadin vihāras in the kingdom and over 1000 Buddhist monks. He said the kingdom was 600 li from east to west, and 300 li from north to south. Its capital was said to be six li in circumference. He also stated that fine cotton and hemp cloth made in the area was traded in neighbouring countries.

Contested period 
In the 7th, 8th, and early 9th centuries, control of the entire region was often contested by Tang China, the Tibetan Empire, and the Uyghur Khaganate; cities frequently changed hands. Tibet seized Aksu in 670, but Tang forces reconquered the region in 692.

The Tang general Tang Jiahui led the Chinese to defeat an Arab-Tibetan attack in the Battle of Aksu (717). The attack on Aksu was joined by Türgesh Khan Suluk. Both Uch Turfan and Aksu were attacked by the Turgesh, Arab, and Tibetan force on 15 August 717. Qarluqs serving under Chinese command, under Arsila Xian, a Western Turkic Qaghan serving under the Chinese Assistant Grand Protector General Tang Jiahui defeated the attack. Al-Yashkuri, the Arab commander and his army fled to Tashkent after they were defeated.

Tibet regained the Tarim Basin in the late 720s, and the Tang dynasty again annexed the region in the 740s. The Battle of Talas led to the gradual withdrawal of Chinese forces, and the region was then contested between the Uyghurs and Tibetans.

Aksu was positioned on a junction of trade routes: the northern Tarim route Silk Road, and the dangerous route north via the Tian Shan's Muzart Pass to the fertile Ili Valley.

Mongol era 

In 1207–08, they submitted to Genghis Khan. Around 1220, Aksu became the capital of the Kingdom of Mangalai. The area had been part of the whole Mongol Empire before it was occupied by the independent-minded Chagatai Khanate under the House of Ögedei in 1286 from the hands of Kublai's Yuan dynasty. After the decline of the Yuan in the mid-14th century and subsequently the Chagatai Khanate in the late 14th century, Aksu fell under the power of Turkic and Mongol warlords.

Along with most of Xinjiang, Aksu fell under the control of the Khojas, and later that of Yaqub Beg, during the Dungan Revolt of 1864–1877. Yakub Beg seized Aksu from Chinese Muslim forces. After the defeat of the rebellion, a learned cleric named Musa Sayrami (1836–1917), who had occupied positions of importance in Aksu under both rebel regimes, authored Tārīkh-i amniyya (History of Peace), which is considered by modern historians as one of the most important historical sources on the period.

Modern era 

British Army officer Francis Younghusband visited Aksu in 1887 on his overland journey from Beijing to India. He described it as being the largest town he had seen on his way from the Chinese capital, with a population of about 20,000, besides other inhabitants of the district and a garrison of about 2,000 soldiers. "There were large bazaars and several inns—some for travellers, others for merchants wishing to make a prolonged stay to sell goods."

In 1913, Aksu County was established.

The Battle of Aksu (1933) occurred here on 31 May 1933. Isma'il Beg, a Uighur, became the rebel Tao-yin of Aksu. After the outbreak of the Ili Rebellion, the Ili National Army forces led by Abdulkerim Abbas attempting to take Aksu were repelled by National Revolutionary Army defenders commanded by Zhao Hanqi after two bitter sieges in September 1945.

On 19 August 1983, Aksu County became Aksu City. The city government began operation on 7 May 1984.

Aksu was the site of a bombing in 2010.

On 23 January 2013,  of territory was transferred from Aksu city to Aral city.

Timeline
Before 600 the region was under control of Huns and Uyghur Turkic tribes.
630: Xuanzang visited the kingdom.
800: Uyghur Khaganate
1000: Kara-Khanid Khanate
1250: Chagatai Khanate
1500: Yarkent Khanate

Geography
Aksu City is divided into two non-contiguous areas. The northern area is inhabited and the southern area is in the Taklamakan Desert. The southern area ends at a strait line in the desert along the 39°28′57″N parallel that divides it from Lop County (Luopu) and Qira County (Cele) in Hotan Prefecture (Hetian).

Neighbours
The kingdom bordered Kashgar to the south-west, and Kucha, Karasahr then Turpan to the east.  Across the desert to the south was Khotan.

Climate
Aksu has a cold desert climate (Köppen climate classification BWk) with extreme seasonal variation in temperature. The frost-free period averages 200–220 days.

Administrative divisions
, Aksu City included seven subdistricts, two towns, four townships and five other areas:

Subdistricts ( / )
Lengger Subdistrict (Langan;  / ), Yengibazar Subdistrict (Yingbazha;  / ), Qizil Kowruk Subdistrict (Hongqiao;  / ), Yengisheher Subdistrict (Xincheng;  / ), Nancheng Subdistrict ( / ), Kokyar Subdistrict (Kekeya;  / ), Dolan Subdistrict (Duolang;  / )
Towns ( / )
Qaratal (Kara Tal, Kaletale;  / ), Aykol (Ayikule;  / )
Townships ( / )
Egerchi Township (Igerchi, Yiganqi;  / ), Bextügman Township (Baishitugeman, Beshtugmen;  / ), Topluq Township (Tuopuluke;  / ), Qumbash Township (Kum Bash, Kumubaxi;  / ), Tuokayi Township
Other areas
Hongqipo Farm, Experimental Forestry Area, Textile Factory City, Economic and Technological Development Zone, Speciality Product Park

Economy
Industries in the city include textiles, construction, chemicals and others. Agricultural products include rice, wheat, corn and cotton. The local speciality is thin-shelled walnuts.

Demographics

Although the Tarim Basin is largely dominated by the Uyghurs, there are many Han Chinese in Aksu due to the presence of bingtuan state farms here. The Chinese government had encouraged migration to Xinjiang from the late 1950s and early 1960s onwards, and by 1998, Han Chinese formed the majority in the urban area of Aksu. The population in 2015, 44.67% of the population was Han Chinese.

As of 2015, 278,210 (54.16%) of the 513,682 residents of the city were Uyghur, 226,781 (44.14%) were Han Chinese and 8,691 were from other ethnic groups.

In the 2010 census figure, the population in the city of Aksu dropped slightly to 535,657.  The difference may be partly due to boundary changes.

In the 2000 census, a figure of 561,822 was recorded for the city's population.

As of 1999, 57.89% of the population of Aksu City was Han Chinese and 40.75% of the population was Uyghur.

Transportation

The county is served by the Southern Xinjiang Railway.
China National Highway 217
China National Highway 314
G3012 Turpan–Hotan Expressway
Aksu Hongqipo Airport

Notable people
 Dolkun Isa, President of the World Uyghur Congress

Historical maps 
Historical English-language maps including Aksu:

See also
 Silk Road transmission of Buddhism

Notes

References

Further reading
Aksu City Historical Annals Editing Committee 阿克苏市史志编纂委员会 ed. (1991) Aksu City Annals. 阿克苏市志. Xinhua. 
Hill, John E. (2009) Through the Jade Gate to Rome: A Study of the Silk Routes during the Later Han Dynasty, 1st to 2nd centuries CE. BookSurge, Charleston, South Carolina. .
Puri, B. N. Buddhism in Central Asia, Motilal Banarsidass Publishers Private Limited, Delhi, 1987.  (2000 reprint).
Stein, Aurel M. 1907. Ancient Khotan: Detailed report of archaeological explorations in Chinese Turkestan, 2 vols. Clarendon Press. Oxford. 
Stein, Aurel M. 1921. Serindia: Detailed report of explorations in Central Asia and westernmost China, 5 vols. London & Oxford. Clarendon Press. Reprint: Delhi. Motilal Banarsidass. 1980. 
Yu, Taishan. 2004. A History of the Relationships between the Western and Eastern Han, Wei, Jin, Northern and Southern Dynasties and the Western Regions. Sino-Platonic Papers No. 131 March 2004. Dept. of East Asian Languages and Civilizations, University of Pennsylvania.
The History of the Western Han records some information about the kingdom.
Either the Old Book of Tang or the New Book of Tang records Xuanzang's information and a little extra.

External links
 Silk Road Seattle – University of Washington (The Silk Road Seattle website contains many useful resources including a number of full-text historical works)

Central Asian Buddhist sites
Populated places along the Silk Road
Populated places in Xinjiang
Oases of China
Aksu Prefecture
National Forest Cities in China
County-level divisions of Xinjiang